Ernst Tognetti was a Swiss wrestler. He competed in the freestyle middleweight event at the 1924 Summer Olympics.

References

Year of birth missing
Year of death missing
Olympic wrestlers of Switzerland
Wrestlers at the 1924 Summer Olympics
Swiss male sport wrestlers
Place of birth missing